Górka Duchowna  is a village in the administrative district of Gmina Lipno, within Leszno County, Greater Poland Voivodeship, in west-central Poland.

The village has an approximate population of 1,000.

Notable residents
 Edmund Bojanowski, Polish layman beatified for sainthood by Pope John Paul II in 1999. He died 7 August 1871 in Górka Duchowna.

References

Villages in Leszno County